The Chattanooga, TN-GA Metropolitan Statistical Area, as defined by the United States Office of Management and Budget, is an area consisting of six counties – three in southeast Tennessee (Hamilton, Marion, and Sequatchie) and three in northwest Georgia (Catoosa, Dade, and Walker) – anchored by the city of Chattanooga.  As of the 2010 census, the MSA had a population of 528,143.  This metropolitan area traverses two time zones.

Counties
Catoosa County, Georgia (ET)
Dade County, Georgia (ET)
Hamilton County, Tennessee (ET)
Marion County, Tennessee (CT)
Sequatchie County, Tennessee (CT)
Walker County, Georgia (ET)

Communities

Places with more than 150,000 inhabitants
Chattanooga, Tennessee (Principal city)

Places with 10,000 to 25,000 inhabitants
East Brainerd, Tennessee 
East Ridge, Tennessee
Middle Valley, Tennessee (CDP)
Red Bank, Tennessee
Soddy-Daisy, Tennessee
Collegedale, Tennessee
Fort Oglethorpe, Georgia

Places with 5,000 to 10,000 inhabitants
Fairview, Georgia (CDP)
Harrison, Tennessee (CDP)
LaFayette, Georgia
Rock Spring, Georgia
Signal Mountain, Tennessee
Dunlap, Tennessee

Places with 1,000 to 5,000 inhabitants

Places with less than 1,000 inhabitants
Flat Top Mountain (CDP)
Ooltewah, Tennessee (CDP)
Orme, Tennessee
Ridgeside, Tennessee
New Hope, Tennessee

Unincorporated places
Bakewell, Tennessee
Birchwood, Tennessee
Haletown, Tennessee
Hixson, Tennessee
Kensington, Georgia
Villanow, Georgia
Rising Fawn, Georgia
Suck Creek, Tennessee
Wildwood, Georgia

Demographics

As of the census of 2010, there were 528,143 people, 189,607 households, and 132,326 families residing within the MSA. The racial makeup of the MSA was 83.14% White, 13.90% African American, 0.30% Native American, 0.97% Asian, 0.05% Pacific Islander, 0.61% from other races, and 1.03% from two or more races. Hispanic or Latino of any race were 1.49% of the population.

The median income for a household in the MSA was $44,197, and the median income for a family was $40,841. Males had a median income of $30,985 versus $22,305 for females. The per capita income for the MSA was $17,414.

Combined Statistical Area
The Chattanooga-Cleveland-Athens, TN-GA Combined Statistical Area is made up of six counties in southeast Tennessee and three counties in northwest Georgia. The statistical area includes the Chattanooga Metropolitan Statistical Area, Cleveland Metropolitan Statistical Area, and the Athens Micropolitan Statistical Area.

See also
Tennessee census statistical areas
List of cities and towns in Tennessee
Georgia statistical areas
List of municipalities in Georgia (U.S. state)

References

 
Geography of Hamilton County, Tennessee
Geography of Marion County, Tennessee
Geography of Sequatchie County, Tennessee
Geography of Catoosa County, Georgia
Geography of Dade County, Georgia
Geography of Walker County, Georgia
Metropolitan areas of Tennessee
Regions of Tennessee
Metropolitan areas of Georgia (U.S. state)
Regions of Georgia (U.S. state)